Željko "Žeki" Šašić (born 31 October 1969) is a Serbian turbo-folk singer. In late 2013, he competed in the first season of the Serbian version of Your Face Sounds Familiar. After the 12 weeks, he claimed 7th place, but was a public favourite with a wide spectre of enjoyed performances as Aca Lukas, Bijelo Dugme, Riblja Čorba, Snežana Babić Sneki and many more.

Discography
Gori more (1994)
Na istoj talasnoj dužini (1995)
Dve rane (1996)
Ona je priča života moga (1997)
Zaboravi me (1999)
Neko drugi (2000)
007 (2003)
Jos kunem se u nas (2012)

References

External links
Facebook page
Klub muzičara profile

1969 births
Living people
Place of birth missing (living people)
Serbian folk-pop singers
20th-century Serbian male singers
Grand Production artists
21st-century Serbian male singers